Luis Angel Caffarelli (born December 8, 1948) is an Argentine mathematician and luminary in the field of partial differential equations and their applications.

Career

Caffarelli was born and grew up in Buenos Aires. He obtained his Masters of Science (1968) and Ph.D. (1972) at the University of Buenos Aires. His Ph.D. advisor was Calixto Calderón. He currently holds the Sid Richardson Chair at the University of Texas at Austin. He also has been a professor at the University of Minnesota, the University of Chicago, and the Courant Institute of Mathematical Sciences at New York University. From 1986 to 1996 he was a professor at the Institute for Advanced Study in Princeton.

Important results

Caffarelli received great recognition with his breakthrough paper "The regularity of free boundaries in higher dimensions" published in 1977 in Acta Mathematica. Since then, he has been considered one of the world's leading experts in free boundary problems and nonlinear partial differential equations. He developed several regularity results for fully nonlinear elliptic equations including the Monge-Ampere equation. He is also famous for his contributions to homogenization.  Recently, he has taken an interest in Integro-differential equations.

One of his most cited and celebrated results regards the Partial regularity of suitable weak solutions of the Navier–Stokes equations, obtained in 1982 in collaboration with Louis Nirenberg and Robert V. Kohn.

Awards and recognition
In 1991 he was elected to the National Academy of Sciences. He has been awarded Doctor Honoris Causa from l'École Normale Supérieure, Paris; University of Notre Dame; Universidad Autónoma de Madrid, and Universidad de La Plata, Argentina. He received the Bôcher Memorial Prize in 1984. Caffarelli is listed as an ISI highly cited researcher.

In 2003 Konex Foundation from Argentina granted him the Diamond Konex Award, one of the most prestigious awards in Argentina, as the most important Scientist of his country in the last decade. In 2005, he received the prestigious Rolf Schock Prize of the Royal Swedish Academy of Sciences "for his important contributions to the theory of nonlinear partial differential equations". He also received the Leroy P. Steele Prize for Lifetime Achievement in Mathematics in 2009. In 2012 he was awarded the Wolf Prize in Mathematics (jointly with Michael Aschbacher) and became a fellow of the American Mathematical Society. In 2017 he gave the Łojasiewicz Lecture (on "Some models of segregation") at the Jagiellonian University in Kraków.

In 2018 he was named a SIAM Fellow and he received the Shaw Prize in Mathematics.

Bibliography
In addition to over two hundred articles in refereed academic journals, Caffarelli has coauthored two books:
Fully Nonlinear Elliptic Equations by Luis Caffarelli and Xavier Cabré (1995), American Mathematical Society. 
A Geometric Approach to Free Boundary Problems by Luis Caffarelli and Sandro Salsa (2005), American Mathematical Society.

References

External links

Home page
Biographical data

1948 births
Members of the United States National Academy of Sciences
20th-century American mathematicians
21st-century American mathematicians
Argentine mathematicians
Living people
Mathematical analysts
Courant Institute of Mathematical Sciences faculty
People from Buenos Aires
Rolf Schock Prize laureates
University of Chicago faculty
University of Minnesota faculty
University of Texas at Austin faculty
Institute for Advanced Study faculty
PDE theorists
Wolf Prize in Mathematics laureates
Fellows of the American Mathematical Society
Fellows of the Society for Industrial and Applied Mathematics